Christopher Walter Edward Surety (1927-2017), was a former athlete who competed for England.

Athletics career
He represented England in the 440 yards hurdles at the 1962 British Empire and Commonwealth Games in Perth, Western Australia.

He was a member of the Ilford Athletic Club and competed in the 1962 European Athletics Championships – Men's 400 metres hurdles.

References

1937 births
2017 deaths
English male hurdlers
Athletes (track and field) at the 1962 British Empire and Commonwealth Games
Commonwealth Games competitors for England